C. Mayer may refer to:
C. Mayer (crater), a lunar crater named after the astronomer Christian Mayer (1719–1783)
people named Christian Mayer
people named Christopher Mayer
people named Carl Mayer
people named Charles Mayer
Christa Mayer - German mezzo-soprano
Constant Mayer - French painter